Sareni is a constituency of the Uttar Pradesh Legislative Assembly covering the city of Sareni in the Rae Bareli district of Uttar Pradesh, India.

Sareni is one of five assembly constituencies in the Rae Bareli Lok Sabha constituency. Since 2008, this assembly constituency is numbered 182 amongst 403 constituencies.

Election results

2022

2017
Bharatiya Janta Party candidate Dhirendra Bahadur Singh won in the 2017 Uttar Pradesh Legislative Elections defeating Bahujan Samaj Party candidate Thakur Prasad Yadav by a margin of 13,007 votes.

References

External links
 

Assembly constituencies of Uttar Pradesh
Raebareli district